Crataegus populnea is a hawthorn native to the northeastern U.S. and southeastern Canada. The flowers have about 10 stamens with red to purple anthers, and the fruit are orange to red, about 1 cm in diameter, spherical or oblong. Crataegus compta is a variant with pear-shaped fruit.

References

populnea
Flora of North America